Magne Kleiven (27 July 1921 – 5 June 1999) was a Norwegian gymnast. He competed in eight events at the 1952 Summer Olympics.

References

1921 births
1999 deaths
Norwegian male artistic gymnasts
Olympic gymnasts of Norway
Gymnasts at the 1952 Summer Olympics
Sportspeople from Lillehammer
20th-century Norwegian people